Piet van Vuuren (6 February 1931 – 2008) is a South African boxer. He was born in Johannesburg. He competed at the 1956 Summer Olympics in Melbourne, in the light heavyweight class.

References

1931 births
2008 deaths
Boxers from Johannesburg
Light-heavyweight boxers
South African male boxers
Olympic boxers of South Africa
Boxers at the 1956 Summer Olympics
Boxers at the 1954 British Empire and Commonwealth Games
Commonwealth Games gold medallists for South Africa
Afrikaner people
Commonwealth Games medallists in boxing
Medallists at the 1954 British Empire and Commonwealth Games